Lomariocycas magellanica, synonym Blechnum magellanicum, costilla de vaca (Chilean Spanish for cow's rib) or palmilla, is a medium-sized fern native with a natural range from Talca at 35°S, to the Magallanes Region in Chile. It grows from sea level up to 2200 m.a.s.l. It grows also in the humid valleys of western Argentina close to the Chilean border.

References

 Florachilena.cl

Blechnaceae
Ferns of Argentina
Ferns of Chile
Plants described in 1824